Zhou Rongxin (1917–1976), was a Chinese politician, educator and architect. He served as Minister of Education of the People's Republic of China and President of Zhejiang University.

Biography
Zhou was born in Penglai, Shandong Province in April 1917. From 1975 to 1976, Zhou was the Minister of Education of the People's Republic of China. From 1958 to 1962, Zhou was the President of Zhejiang University in Hangzhou. From 1965 to 1975, Zhou was the Secretary-general of the State Council of the People's Republic of China; during this period, he was an important assistant of Premier Zhou Enlai. Zhou was the first and second Director of the Chinese Architectural Society.

Zhou committed suicide after a campaign against him of persecution on 13 April 1976, at age 59, during the Cultural Revolution.  His absence from the Chinese government was not noticed in the West until September 10, when his name was one of three of major officials (in addition to Railway Minister Wan Li and Xinhua Press agency director Chu Mu-chih) omitted from the list of dignitaries attending the funeral of Chairman Mao Zedong.  "Mr. Chou came under attack in wall posters at Tsinghua University in Peking last December at the beginning of the anitrightist campaign," a report in The New York Times noted, "and is rumored to have died since, possibly by suicide."

References

1917 births
1976 deaths
Academic staff of Zhejiang University
Politicians from Yantai
People's Republic of China politicians from Shandong
Ministers of Education of the People's Republic of China
Educators from Shandong
People persecuted to death during the Cultural Revolution
Presidents of Zhejiang University
People from Penglai, Shandong